Wongaksa may refer to;

Wongaksa Pagoda, Seoul, South Korea.
Wongaksa (theatre), a modern Korean theatre
Wongaksa (Gwangju)
Wongaksa (Gigye, Pohang)